The Revue de l'Orient Latin is a 12-volume set of medieval documents which was published from 1893–1911. It was a continuation of the Archives de l'Orient Latin, two volumes of which were published from 1881–1884. Various medieval documents and letters from the sets are often cited in scholarly works about the Crusades. The Revue is often abbreviated ROL and the "Archives" are abbreviated AOL, but often the two groups of documents are referred to together.

The Archives were published in Paris. The Revue was the official journal of the archaeological foundation "Société de l'Orient latin" founded in 1875 by Count Paul Riant (1836–1888), and was published at the society's headquarters in Geneva. Initial publications were divided into geographical and historical series. The geographical portions contained the itineraries of pilgrims. The historical series included chronicles, letters, and charters.

See also
 Text publication society

References

  Jean Richard, "The Société de l'Orient Latin described by its founder", in Bulletin of the Society for the Study of the Crusades and the Latin East 4, 1984, 19-22

External links
 Worldcat listing for "Revue de l'Orient Latin"
 Worldcat list for "Archives de l'Orient latin"
 Periodicals Service Company
 Catholic Encyclopedia - "Crusades (Sources and Bibliography)"
 "Nomen Omen: Paul Riant (1836-88) and Scandinavian Crusading Studies"
 Revue de l'Orient Latin at Gallica (1893-1902 only)

1881 establishments in France
1911 disestablishments in France
Defunct literary magazines published in France
French-language magazines
History magazines
+
Magazines established in 1881
Magazines disestablished in 1911
Magazines published in Paris
Medieval literature